The Bridge in Jefferson Borough, which carries Cochran's Mill Road over Lick Run, in Allegheny County, Pennsylvania, is a single arch stone bridge built in 1901. It was listed on the National Register of Historic Places in 1988.

Note, it is a different Cochran's Mill, in Armstrong County, which was the birthplace of Nellie Bly (Elizabeth Jane "Pink" Cochran).

References

Road bridges on the National Register of Historic Places in Pennsylvania
Bridges completed in 1901
Bridges in Allegheny County, Pennsylvania
National Register of Historic Places in Allegheny County, Pennsylvania
Stone arch bridges in the United States